Kita Sysavanh (born 19 June 1983) is a Lao professional football player. An attacking midfielder who plays on the wings, he is known for his long range shooting, crossing and passing. Sysavanh made his debut for Laos in 2007 and has since become a mainstay in the Laos midfield.

Club career
Sysavanh currently plays for Panama City Pirates.

International career
Dias made his debut for Laos in 2007 and was a part of the team that successfully attempted to qualify for the 2007 ASEAN Football Championship.

External links

1983 births
Laotian footballers
Laos international footballers
Laotian expatriate footballers
People from Vientiane
Living people
Expatriate soccer players in the United States
Expatriate footballers in Malaysia
Laotian expatriate sportspeople in Malaysia
Association football midfielders